Priogymnanthus apertus is a species of flowering plant in the family Oleaceae. It is endemic to Ecuador.

References

apertus
Endemic flora of Ecuador
Endangered plants
Taxonomy articles created by Polbot